The Govan Stones are an internationally-important museum collection of early medieval carved stones displayed at Govan Old Parish Church in Glasgow, Scotland.

Description 

The stones are thought to have been created to commemorate the power and wealth of the rulers of the Brittonic Kingdom of Strathclyde.

Forty-five stones existed as late as the 1970s. However, fourteen recumbent gravestones, which had not been taken into the church and were lying next to the east wall of the churchyard, were thought to have been destroyed when the neighbouring Harland and Wolff shipyard plating shed was demolished in 1973, with the damaged early medieval stones being mistaken for debris. Nevertheless, one was rediscovered in 2019 by a fourteen-year-old schoolboy, Mark McGettigan, working as part of the ‘Stones 'n' Bones’ archaeology and heritage programme. Two more recumbents were uncovered subsequently, prompting hopes that more of the stones - possibly as many as the fourteen originally thought destroyed - had survived.

The remaining carved stones are the Govan Sarcophagus, five hogback stones (of a type originating in Anglo-Scandinavian Yorkshire), four standing crosses and twenty-one recumbents.

The centrepiece of the collection is the Govan Sarcophagus, which is thought to commemorate St. Constantine, the son of Pictish king Kenneth MacAlpin. It features carvings of a Pictish-style stag hunting scene and various stylised animals. Carved from solid sandstone, the sarcophagus is the only one of its kind from pre-Norman, Northern Britain.

History 
The stones have been dated back to the 9th–11th centuries when the Vikings raided the Clyde region and the territories beyond. The Annals of Ulster tell us that Vikings destroyed the twin citadel at Dumbarton Rock, strategically located at the confluence of the Clyde and Leven rivers, in AD 870 after a four-month siege. This fortress, known as Alt Clut in the local Brittonic language, was the centre of an ancient kingdom of Britons.

With the king of Alt Clut, Artgal, either killed or enslaved by the Vikings, Govan and Partick, further up the river, gained great strategic importance as a new dynasty was established for the successor kingdom of Strathclyde. Govan, already an ancient Christian site with burials dating back to AD 450-600, became an important ecclesiastical centre for this new kingdom.

The presence of the five hogback stones in Govan suggests the area was settled, or at least partly settled, by Vikings. These large sandstone blocks, seemingly designed to resemble Scandinavian longhouses, were found exclusively in areas of northern Britain where Vikings settled. Nowhere else are there hogback stones quite as large as the five in Govan.

"It underpins this idea that this British kingdom of Strathclyde has some strong connections with the Scandinavian world. My feeling is that this is meant to represent a lord's hall or a chieftain's hall." - Stephen Driscoll, Professor of Historical Archaeology at Glasgow University.The sarcophagus was discovered in the graveyard in 1855 when a grave was being dug to the south east of the church. Recognising their significance and to protect the stones from the elements, they were moved from the surrounding graveyard and placed on display within the church itself in 1926. Until that point, the stones had lain in the churchyard for over a thousand years.

Scotland's hidden gems 
The British Museum affirmed the importance of the collection when they took one of the hogback stones to London as part of the exhibition Vikings: Life and Legend (March 2014 to June 2014).

In August 2017, the Govan Stones were voted Scotland's best 'hidden gem' in a nationwide competition, receiving more than two thousand votes in the nationwide poll. They have been described as of international significance.

References

External links 
 

Govan
Viking Age sites in Scotland